The 1854 Michigan gubernatorial election was held on November 7, 1854. Republican nominee Kinsley S. Bingham defeated Democratic nominee John S. Barry with 53.02% of the vote.

General election

Candidates
Major party candidates
Kinsley S. Bingham, Republican
John S. Barry, Democratic

Results

References

1854
Michigan
Gubernatorial
November 1854 events